The Man with the Hispano (French: L'homme à l'Hispano) is a 1926 French silent drama film directed by Julien Duvivier and starring Huguette Duflos, Georges Galli and Acho Chakatouny. The title refers to a luxury Hispano-Suiza car. It was based on a novel of the same title by Pierre Frondaie and was remade as a sound film The Man with the Hispano in 1933.

The film's sets were designed by the art director Fernand Delattre. Location shooting took place in Paris and Biarritz.

Cast
 Huguette Duflos as Stéphane Oswill 
 Georges Galli as Georges Dewalter 
 Acho Chakatouny as Lord William Meredith Oswill 
 Madeleine Rodrigue as Madame Déléone 
 Anthony Gildès as Maître Mont-Normand 
 Angèle Decori as Antoinette - la femme du garde-chasse 
 Georges Péclet as Déléone - l'homme à l'Hispano 
 Luc Dartagnan as Le garde 
 Mendès as Le garde-chasse 
 Angyal as La femme de chambre 
 Jean Diéner
 Charles Moretti
 Raymond Narlay
 Louis Vonelly

References

Bibliography
 Goble, Alan. The Complete Index to Literary Sources in Film. Walter de Gruyter, 1999.
 McCann, Ben. Julien Duvivier. Oxford University Press, 2017.

External links

1926 films
French silent feature films
1920s French-language films
Films directed by Julien Duvivier
French black-and-white films
French drama films
1926 drama films
Films based on French novels
Silent drama films
1920s French films